Azercell is an Azerbaijani telecommunications company based in Baku. It is the largest mobile network operator in Azerbaijan.

Company background 
Azercell Telecom LLC was established on 19 January 1996.

Azercell Telecom started its activities on 15 December 1996 offering subscribers mobile telecommunications services based on postpaid system. The prepaid system was launched with tariff package — SimSim, in 1998.

On 5 March 2018, Azerbaijan International Telecom (AzInTelecom) and the company Fintur Holdings B.V. signed an agreement to sell 51.3 percent of the shares of Azertel Telekomunikasyon Yatırım Dış Ticaret A.Ş. (Azertel). Azertel is the sole founder of Azercell Telecom Limited Liability Company.

Services

4G 
Azercell announced on 24 May 2012, the launch of services based on the 4G platform. Azercell's 4G network covers all of Baku city and nearby towns. The networks operates on 1800 MHz frequency. The second region where the 4G network got deployed, is the Nakhchivan Autonomous Republic.

Market share and coverage 
51% of Azerbaijan’s mobile market belongs to Azercell; while its geographical coverage constitutes 94,15% and population coverage is 98.70%.

Subscribers

Investments 
Since Azercell began operations in December 1996, the company has invested more than US$2 billion in Azerbaijan.

Taxes 
According to Azerbaijan's Ministry of Taxes, Azercell Telecom LLC is the second largest taxpayer operating outside of the country's oil sector. During its first five years of activity, the company contributed a total of US$780 million into the state budget and other state funds.

See also
 Telecommunications in Azerbaijan
 Ministry of Communications and Information Technologies (Azerbaijan)
 List of Azerbaijani companies

References

External links 

Mobile phone companies of Azerbaijan
Azerbaijani brands
Companies based in Baku
Azerbaijani companies established in 1996
Technology companies established in 1996